Loth Schout (1600 – 1655), was a Dutch Golden Age brewer of Haarlem.

Biography
He was born in Haarlem as the son of judge Jan Jacobsz Schout and Dirkje Steyn, brewers of Twee Gecroonde Starren. Loth became a flag bearer of the St Adrian militia in 1622-1630. He was portrayed by Frans Hals in his schutterstuk called The Banquet of the Officers of the St Adrian Militia Company in 1627. He quit the militia when he married on 25 August 1630 to Geertruyd Borst (d.1649),  the daughter of Cornelis Gerbrandsz & Trijntje Willemsdr, brewers in De Passer.

He died in Haarlem.

References

Loth Schout in De Haarlemse Schuttersstukken, by Jhr. Mr. C.C. van Valkenburg, pp. 60, Haerlem : jaarboek 1961, ISSN 0927-0728, on the website of the North Holland Archives

1600 births
1655 deaths
People from Haarlem
Frans Hals
Dutch brewers